Ballymore may refer to:

Places

Northern Ireland
Ballymore, County Armagh, a civil parish and townland in County Armagh
Ballymore, County Londonderry, a townland in County Londonderry

Republic of Ireland
Ballymore, County Cork, a village on Great Island, Cork Harbour
Ballymore, County Donegal, a townland in Glencolumbkille civil parish
Ballymore Eustace, town in County Kildare often shortened to "Ballymore"
Ballymore, County Westmeath, a village and townland in Ballymore civil parish, barony of Rathconrath
Ballymore, County Wexford, two townlands in County Wexford
Ballymore Castle, in Lawrencetown, County Galway, Republic of Ireland

Australia
Ballymore Stadium, Australia

Other uses
Ballymore Group, an Irish–based property company
Ballymore (horse)

See also 
Ballimore, a village in New South Wales, Australia
Balmore, Scotland